Bill Bickard is the American  voice-over actor  most famous for his work on Iron Chef as the dub voice for the announcer, Kenji Fukui. He was also a PA announcer for Japan Professional Baseball's 2002 All Star Game vs. Major League Baseball players.

References

American male voice actors
Living people
Year of birth missing (living people)